The  is a rapid transit electric multiple unit (EMU) train type operated by Osaka Municipal Subway in Japan since 1990.

Variants
  21 series: 10-car sets used on the Midōsuji Line and the Kita-Osaka Kyuko Railway Namboku Line
  22 series: 6-car sets used on the Tanimachi Line
  23 series: 6-car sets used on the Yotsubashi Line
  24 series: 6-car sets used on the Chūō Line and the Kintetsu Keihanna Line
  25 series: 4-car sets used on the Sennichimae Line

Formation
Trains are formed as follows.

21 series

Car 6 is designated as a women-only car (Weekday only).

22/23/24/OTS series

22 series car 3 is designated as a women-only car (Rush hour only).

25 series

References

Electric multiple units of Japan
New 20 series
New 20 series
Hitachi multiple units
Kawasaki multiple units
Train-related introductions in 1990
750 V DC multiple units
Nippon Sharyo multiple units
Kinki Sharyo multiple units
Tokyu Car multiple units
Alna Koki rolling stock